Planned liberalism is an economic policy followed in Cameroon since the 1960s that aims to merge the best concepts of capitalism and socialism.

In 1965, Cameroon changed from its previous economic philosophy, African socialism, under the guidance of its first president, Ahmadou Ahidjo. Under planned liberalism, the state began regulating and managing natural resources and guiding foreign investment into specific economic sectors or geographic areas. In the process, the government has partnered with foreign firms to set up various parastatal enterprises. Meanwhile, it has encouraged private enterprise and investment and the operation of market forces.

Critics claim that planned liberalism has failed due to widespread corruption, overwhelming government bureaucracy, and ill-advised government backing of certain foreign investors. These faults became evident during the economic crisis of the mid-1980s. Cameroon under Paul Biya has since increasingly turned to privatisation of state-owned industries to stimulate its economy.

Notes

References
 DeLancey, Mark W., and Mark Dike DeLancey (2000): Historical Dictionary of the Republic of Cameroon (3rd ed.). Lanham, Maryland: The Scarecrow Press.

Economic systems
Economy of Cameroon